Carlos Joaquín Gradin (20 May 1918 – 31 March 2002), also known as Carlos Gradín, was an Argentine surveyor and archaeologist. He carried out numerous studies in the Patagonian region, and is known for his extensive studies of Cueva de las Manos. He was a member of the National Scientific and Technical Research Council (CONICET).

Education and career 
He was a recognized specialist in Patagonian rock art.

Gradin became a surveyor and archaeologist, as well as a member of CONICET. His career lasted for over 30 years.

Archaeological work 
Gradin carried out numerous studies in the Patagonian region. He was considered by Luis Abel Orquera to have been "the principal authority on indigenous Pampean-Patagonian art."

Work at Cueva de las Manos 
Carlos Gradin is known for his extensive studies of Cueva de las Manos. Gradin and his team's study of cave art in and around Cueva de las Manos formed the most important research on the site. Him and his team began excavating the sites in 1964, which marked the beginning of their 30-year-long study.

In his studies, Gradin helped to separate the different stylistic sequences of the cave, and of rock art in Patagonia as a whole.

The importance of his discoveries to the country's natural and cultural heritage resulted in the site being named a United Nations Educational, Scientific and Cultural Organization (UNESCO) World Heritage Site in 1999.

Death and legacy 
Carlos J. Gradin was born in 1918 and died in 2002, making him 83 years old at the time of his death.

Gradin has an Archaeological Museum named after him in Perito Moreno, Argentina. As of 2019, the building is still under construction.

References

Further reading

External links 
 Museo De Arqueología "Carlos Gradín" ["Carlos Gradín" Museum of Archeology] (in Spanish)—an article covering the new Carlos J. Gradin Museum of Archeology
En Tus Manos… Cueva De Las Manos (PDF) [In Your Hands...Cave of the Hands] (in Spanish)—a brochure for the new Carlos J. Gradin Museum of Archeology

Argentine archaeologists
20th-century archaeologists
21st-century archaeologists
Surveyors
1918 births
2002 deaths